Fall of Giants is a 2010 historical novel by Welsh author Ken Follett. It is the first part of the Century Trilogy which follows five interrelated families throughout the course of the 20th century. The first book covers notable events such as World War I, the Russian Revolution, and the struggle for women's suffrage. The sequel Winter of the World covers World War II and was published on September 18, 2012. The third book, Edge of Eternity, covers the Cold War and was published in 2014.

Plot summary
The novel begins with the thirteen-year-old Billy Williams, nicknamed 'Billy-with-Jesus', going to work his first day in the coal mine underneath the fictional Welsh town of Aberowen in 1911.

Three years later, the main story begins. Edward "Fitz" Fitzherbert, Earl Fitzherbert, who maintains a country estate in Aberowen and licenses the land on which the coal mine is built, hosts a party for many powerful people around the world. His guests include:

 Lady Maud Fitzherbert, Fitz's sister, who is far more liberal than her conservative brother.
 Walter von Ulrich, a German nobleman and a former schoolmate of Fitz's. He and Maud begin at the party to act on the mutual attraction they have felt for years.
 Graf (Count) Robert von Ulrich, Walter's Austrian homosexual cousin.
 Gus Dewar, a highly educated American who is also a close adviser to President Woodrow Wilson.
 Bea Fitzherbert, Fitz's wife, a Russian Princess.
 King George V, King of the British Empire.
 Mary of Teck, wife of King George V.
Major characters introduced after the party include Grigori and Lev Peshkov, two Russian orphans who work in a locomotive factory and have personal reasons to hold a grudge against Princess Bea and the rest of the Russian royal family. Grigori and Lev's father was executed by Bea's aristocratic family for alleged improper grazing of cattle on Bea's family's land.

The overall theme of the novel revolves around common people trying, and many times succeeding, in throwing off the yokes so often placed on them by a society (largely focused on Britain and Russia) dominated by the landed aristocracy.

There are several key themes linking facets in world history at this point. They include the causes of the First World War, the collapse of the Russian Empire, and  Germany's role in the continuance of a bloody war that led to its economic collapse and the postwar rise of Hitler.

Regarding Russian history, Follett portrays Lenin's role in the rise of the Bolsheviks as a ploy of the German intelligence service as an attempt to divide and conquer Russian resistance on the Eastern Front. He does not clearly explain the rise of Stalin as Lenin died. This may be better explained in the second volume (he does this at about page 500 of volume 2, which seems to understate the role of Stalin in Europe and US history).

Throughout the novel, several chapters are devoted to the rise of women's rights in Britain and role of the Labour Party in promoting issues affecting worker safety following a mining accident in Wales.

Through these chapters, Follett displays the considerable differences in social status of the miners and the owners of the mines in quality of life, health and education. With tragic accuracy, he reviews the misery and suffering of soldiers in the trenches of the Western Front, including, poison gas, futile charges against artillery and machine gun posts etc. as the war continues, thousands are slain and the so-called leaders continue to promote it as a victorious exercise. He focuses on how industrial interests on both sides benefited from the war, continuing it as factory production went up and the dead were brought back to England.

The book explores the background of Germany at the time, the costs of their endless efforts to "win" leading to a loss that later was cause for a forlorn corporal, Adolf Hitler, to seek his own revenge for the economic devastation of Germany under the Treaty of Versailles.

The characters and their extended families find their fortunes changing for the better and for the worse due to both their interactions with each other and the effects of the First World War.

In the course of the book, virtually all female characters get pregnant – with or without being married – and give birth to one or two children. These will be teenagers in the 1930s and young adults during the Second World War, and will be the main characters of the series' second book.

Critical reception
The book received generally positive reviews, lauding the extensive historical research that has been intertwined into the narrative.

References

2010 British novels
Novels by Ken Follett
Welsh novels
Novels set during World War I
British historical novels
Macmillan Publishers books
Novels set in the 1910s
Novels set in the 1920s
Family saga novels
Cultural depictions of Woodrow Wilson
Cultural depictions of George V
Novels set in the United Kingdom
Novels set in the United States
Novels set in the Russian Empire
Novels set in Germany